Saint Benedict Abbey may refer to:

 Saint Benedict Abbey, Quebec, Canada
 St. Benedict Abbey (Massachusetts), U.S.
 Abbaye Saint-Benoît de Koubri, Burkina Faso
 Benedictine Abbey of Pietersburg, Limpopo, South Africa
 Abadía de San Benito, Luján, Buenos Aires Province, Argentina

See also

Fleury Abbey, in Saint-Benoît-sur-Loire, Loiret, France